James H. Evans (born 1954 in West Virginia) is an American photographer. Currently based in Marathon, Texas, Evans' work focuses on documenting the West Texas area through subject, landscape, and portrait photography. Though Evans works all around the Big Bend area of Texas, he is best known for his work within Big Bend National Park.

Artist Biography
James H. Evans moved to the Big Bend area of West Texas in December 1988. Previously, Evans worked in Philadelphia and New Jersey, shooting drag races and portraits of the drivers. He was the official photographer for United Bracket Racing Association (1975-1979.) This organization was responsible for the introduction and assimilation of bracket racing classes in the NHRA. He later moved to Corpus Christi and then on to Austin, where he worked on commercial and product photography. After taking a hiking trip to Big Bend National Park, Evans decided to drop everything and move to the small town of Marathon, on the outskirts of the park.

Evans dedicated his life and work to documenting the Big Bend Area. His work encompasses traditional landscapes, night-scapes, portraits of the unique inhabitants of the area, and defining subject matter. In 2003 Big Bend Pictures, Evans' first book, was published; the book sparked more interest in Evans' work, allowing him to publish his second book, Crazy from the Heat, in 2011.

The Weston Galleria Hotel in Dallas commissioned him in 2008 to supply photographs for their hotel. This job was pivotal for Evans, as it compelled him to begin shooting digitally. Previously his work was all shot in film, (primarily black and white, square format,) with his Hasselblad. This introduction to the "Digital Age" allowed Evans to expand his work. In newer digital pieces, there is generally a much stronger focus on color, though Evans' continues to work in black and white and in the traditional darkroom.

In 2013 Evans was hired by a Texas businessman to photograph his family's ranch. For a year, Evans was given creative direction with the imagery, and the timetable of the project allowed Evans to document the ranch throughout all four seasons. The final 100+ photographs were hung in the multi-million dollar mansion on the ranch property.

In 2015 Evans documented what was dubbed 100 year bloom in and around Big Bend National Park. It was featured in Texas Monthly.

2018 Evans is currently working on two books, to be announced.

Artist's Works

Books

Big Bend Pictures 
Big Bend Pictures (published 2003, foreword by Robert Draper) is a collection of Evans' work in the Big Bend area spanning 1989-2002. The book contains not only landscapes of Big Bend National Park, but also portraits of locals and subjects.

Big Bend Pictures received much publicity, including a feature in Texas Monthly (2003), a spot in Rounce & Coffin Club Western Books Exhibition (2004), and the Southwest Book Award from the Border Regional Library Association (2003). It is currently (2014) in its third printing.

Crazy from the Heat 

Crazy from the Heat (published 2011, foreword by Rebecca Solnit) is Evans' second book, including work spanning 20 years of living in the Big Bend Area. The images included vary between "magnificent color landscapes and panoramas, dramatic night work, sensuous nudes, and vivid portraits." Not only is there variation in content, but in the formatting of the images; they range between color, black and white, traditional darkroom, digital, square format, and long panoramas.

Publications 

Beginning in 1990, Evans has regularly had featured work in Texas Monthly, and he is currently a contributing photographer for the publication. His contributions vary from large photo essays to single images featured with articles. Some of his most noteworthy portraits published in Texas Monthly include those of Cormac McCarthy, Susan Combs, Elmer Kelton, Henry Thomas, and Robert James Waller. In 2011, in an article about Texas Wildfires, Evans covered the Rockhouse Fire between Ft. Davis and Alpine in a series of panoramic images. The March 2003 issue featured an essay, "Chasing Shadows", by John Spong paired with Evans' personal work. "Dirt and Light", featured in the February 2011 issue, included a photographic essay of Evans' color panoramas, and yet another issue and web article ("Light in the Darkness" 2006) featured an essay detailing Evans' night work. In September 2014, the magazine ran an online article (Ranch Project) about the yearlong photographic venture Evans' had just completed.

Evans' has been featured in a number of other publications, including Oxford American, GQ, Time, The Wall Street Journal, The Big Bend Travel Guide, Southern Living, Desert Candle, Texas Highways, Organica Magazine, Santa Fean Magazine, Cowboys & Indians, Auto Industries Magazine, and more.

Exhibitions 

2019 Sarah Foltz Gallery Houston, Texas
2018 Sarah Foltz Gallery Houston, Texas
2016 Hunt Gallery San Antonio, Texas
2015 Stephen L. Clark Gallery Austin, Texas2013 Stephen L. Clark Gallery Austin, Texas2008 Stephen L. Clark Gallery Austin, Texas2008 Art Museum of South Texas Corpus Christi, Texas2008 Al Rendon Gallery San Antonio, Texas2008 Stephen L. Clark Gallery Austin, Texas2007 Westin Hotel Dallas, Texas2007 Alpine Gallery Night Alpine, Texas2005 Adair Margo Gallery El Paso, Texas2004 Al Rendon Gallery San Antonio, Texas2004 Tadu Contemporary Art Santa Fe, New Mexico2004 Adair Margo Gallery El Paso, Texas2003 Stephen L. Clark Gallery Austin, Texas2003 Galveston Arts Center Galveston, Texas2003 Museum of the Big Bend Alpine, Texas2002 Adair Margo Gallery El Paso, Texas2002 Terlingua House Alpine, Texas2001 El Paso Museum of Art El Paso, Texas2001 Houston Center of Photography Houston, Texas2001 Afterimage Gallery Dallas, Texas2001 Anam Cara Gallery Ketchum, Idaho2001 Marfa Book Company Marfa, Texas2000 Longview Museum or Art Longview, Texas1999 Austin Museum of Art Austin, Texas1998 Stephen L. Clark Gallery Austin, Texas Representation 
 Sarah Foltz Gallery  Houston, Texas
 Adair Margo Fine Art El Paso, Texas
 Afterimage Gallery Dallas, Texas
 AIPAD 
 Evans Gallery Marathon, Texas
 Stephen L. Clark Gallery Austin, Texas

Collections 

 Art Museum of Southeast Texas, Beaumont, Texas
 The Art Museum of South Texas, Corpus Christi, Texas
 El Paso Museum of Art, El Paso, Texas
 Harry Ransom Center, Austin, Texas
 Longview Museum of Fine Arts, Longview, Texas
 Museum of Fine Arts, Houston, Houston, Texas
 San Antonio Museum of Art, San Antonio, Texas
 Westin Hotel, Dallas, Texas
 Wittliff collections, San Marcos, Texas

References

12. Texas Monthly January 2023 https://www.texasmonthly.com/news-politics/the-untold-story-of-the-insular-texas-family-that-invaded-the-u-s-capitol/

External links 
 Artist Website

1954 births
Living people
Photographers from Texas
People from Brewster County, Texas